The Church of the Sacred Heart is a Roman Catholic parish church in the Roman Catholic Archdiocese of New York, located at 1253 Shakespeare Avenue (West 168 Street), Bronx, New York City 10452. The church building was designed by architect Elliott Lynch, who designed several other Catholic churches and parish schools. The church is connected with a school of the same name.

History
The New York Times reported in 1910: "New Bronx Church: Plans were filed for a new brick church and rectory to replace the present frame edifices of the Sacred Heart Roman Catholic Church, in Shakespeare Avenue, between 168th and 169th Streets. The church is to occupy a plot 75 by '280, and the rectory 25 by 280, the total cost being placed at $590,000 by the architect, Elliott Lynch."

References 

Dunlap, David W. From Abyssinian to Zion: A Guide to Manhattan's Houses of Worship. (New York: Columbia University Press, 2004.) p. 207.

External links
|Church Website

Roman Catholic churches in the Bronx
Roman Catholic churches completed in 1910
20th-century Roman Catholic church buildings in the United States